Gnanananda (Nia-na-nan-da) was an Indian guru, referred to by followers as Swami Sri Gnanananda Giri. He was the Chief Disciple of the Sri Sivaratna Giri Swamigal and one of the leaders (Peetathipathis) of the Jyotir Math, one of the four Maths established by Adi Sankara. This lineage of Peetathipathis is also called the 'Giri' Paramparai, as seen from the Peetathipathis' name which ends with 'Giri'. Gnanananda is a Mahayogi, Siddha Purusha, Himalayan sage and Indian philosopher. He believed in Advaita Vedanta because of his lineage.  He had a number of disciples including Vidyananda, Triveni and Dasagiri. He blessed Hari to 1. Haridhos  Giri to uplift and help mankind from sufferings through Guru Bakthi Prachara Swami had a number of accomplished disciples through his abnormally long tenure- Bramanamda who took samadhi at Puskar, Achutadasa of Polur. He loved obsurity. He changed identity to avoid being recognised .

Birth and childhood
Sources report his birth as early 19th century in the village Mangalapuri in North Kanara District of Karnataka. to an orthodox Brahmin couple, Venkoba Ganapati and SriMathi Sakku Bai. He was named Subramanyan at birth, and left his home at a very early age. His birthday is celebrated on the birth star of Kritika in January (the Tamil month of Thai).

Sanyasa
Sivaratna Giri Swami accepted Subramanyan as his disciple and named him Pragnana Brahmachari. Sivaratna Giri initiated Gnanananda in the traditional manner into the Giri order of Jyotir Mutt and gave him the monastic name of Sri Gnanananda Giri. Sivaratna Gnanananda adorned the 6th lineage of Peetam of Jagadguru Totakacharya for some time. However, he nominated one Ananda Giri in his place and retired to the height of the Himalayas for penance. Gnananda spent many years at the sacred spot of Gangotri and icy caves of the Himalayas in intense tapas. He travelled extensively on foot, spanning the whole India and Tibet, Nepal, Burma, Sri Lanka and Malaya. He met many holy men over the course of his pilgrimage.

Teaching and establishment of ashrams
Gnanananda returned to India and established an ashram at Attayampatti in Salem and then at Siddhalingamadam near Villupuram. The most famous ashram, named "Sri Gnanananda Tapovanam", is situated two miles away from Tirukkoyilur. Gnanananda built temples for the deities of Gnanaganesa, Gnanaskandan, Gananapurisa, Gnanambika, Mahalaksmi, Gnana Venugopala, Gnana Bhairavar and Gnana AnjaneyanShiva in Tapovanam. Another ashram was constructed in Yercaud, a hill station near Salem. It was called "Pranavanilayam". This was a retreat for contemplatives. Giri wanted to develop it as a centre for comparative religion. In contrast to Tapovanam, no rituals were permitted in Yercaud. The central emphasis was on meditation and dhyana.

Swami Gnanananda Giri taught a number of paths based on the aptitude of his disciples  Therefore, some of disciples are conversant in the "path of knowledge" (jñāna-marga) while others are the "path of works" (karma-marga) and still others follow the "path of faith" (bhakti-marga). His senior monastic disciple Vidyananda Giri was a profound scholar and linguist and brought out Tamil translations of Shankara's commentaries on the Bhagavad Gita and the Upanishads. He also made available Tamil versions of famous Advaitic texts like Sanatsujatiyam. He trained followers in Advaitic Nidhidhyasana. Another of his lineage, Satyananda was associated with Franklin Merrell-Wolff and taught his method of "introceptive knowledge".

Swami Gnanananda Giri realised that the path of Vichara and Nidhidhyasana was confined to a few philosophically advanced aspirants.  For devotees at a lesser level, he advocated stuti, japa and nama sankirtan. He was well versed in all the modes of Bhajana Sampradaya and he held that Hari Bhajana for ordinary devotees  was the easiest way to attain "Moksha". He had chosen Haridhos Giri propagated the importance of Namasankeetanam.
 Gnanananda had instructed and blessed Hari, the son of the great Nat Annaji Rao. The boy later became known as "Haridhos Giri" on being initiated in sanyasa on his own. Haridhos carried his guru's (Gnanananda's) sandals (Paadhuka) with him to all the holy places he went to. He also visited many holy places with his Guru Paadhuka to propagate the importance of singing god's praises ("NamaSankeerthanam") as instructed by his guru. As part of spreading the cult of Namasankeerthanam, Giri established Mandalis and Samajams in various countries..

References

External links

Official site

1974 deaths
20th-century Indian philosophers
Advaitin philosophers
Indian Hindu monks
Ontologists
Sanskrit writers
20th-century Hindu philosophers and theologians
Year of birth missing